Give Him the Ooh-La-La is a 1958 studio album by American jazz singer Blossom Dearie.

This album is the second of six albums Dearie recorded for Verve Records. This album follows up on the success of Dearie's first album, the eponymously titled Blossom Dearie.

Track listings
"Just One of Those Things" (Cole Porter) – 2:03
"Like Someone in Love" (Johnny Burke, Jimmy Van Heusen) – 4:33
"Between the Devil and the Deep Blue Sea" (Harold Arlen, Ted Koehler) – 2:28
"They Say It's Spring" (Marty Clark, Bob Haymes) – 3:46
"Try Your Wings" (Michael Preston Barr, Dion McGregor) – 3:26
"Bang Goes the Drum (And You're In Love)" (David Heneker) – 3:24
"The Riviera" (Cy Coleman, Joseph Allen McCarthy) – 3:48
"The Middle of Love" (Maurice Goodman, Billie Wallington) – 2:35
"Plus je t'embrasse" (Ben Ryan, Max François) – 2:31
"Give Him the Ooh-La-La" (Porter) – 2:41
"Let Me Love You" (Bart Howard) – 2:44
"I Walk a Little Faster" (Coleman, Carolyn Leigh) – 4:18
 CD reissue bonus tracks not included on the original 1958 release:
"Give Him the Ooh-La-La" (Alternate Take #1) – 2:45
"Give Him the Ohh-La-La" (Alternate Take #2) – 1:50

Personnel
Blossom Dearie – vocals, piano
Ray Brown – double bass
Jo Jones – drums
Herb Ellis – guitar

References

1958 albums
Blossom Dearie albums
Verve Records albums
Albums produced by Norman Granz
Albums produced by Blossom Dearie